Tshepo is an African unisex given name meaning hope and derived from the Sesotho verb 'tshepa', which means hope. People with this name include:

 Tshepo Mangena (born 1983), South African cricketer
 Tshepo Motaung (born 1999), South African cricketer
 Tshepo Motlhabankwe (born 1980), Motswana footballer
 Tshepo Motsepe (born 1953), First Lady of South Africa
 Tshepo Moreki (born 1993), South African cricketer
 Tshepo Ngwane (1976 - 2015), South African actor
 Tshepo Ntuli (born 1997), South African cricketer
 Tshepo Phaswana (born 1998), Botswana cricketer
 Tshepo Seroalo (born 1997), South African cricketer 
 Tshepo Tshite (born 1997), South African middle-distance runner
 Tshepo Ntoagae (born march 1996) south African super boy.

References
   

African given names